John Sullivan,  (10 April 1830 – 28 June 1884) was a sailor in the Royal Navy and an Irish recipient of the Victoria Cross, the highest award for gallantry in the face of the enemy that can be awarded to British and Commonwealth forces.

Royal Navy
Sullivan was 25 years old, and a boatswain's mate in the Royal Navy, serving in the Naval Brigade during the Crimean War, when the following deed took place for which he was awarded the Victoria Cross (VC).

On 10 April 1855 at Sebastopol, in Crimea, Boatswain's Mate Sullivan, as captain of one of the guns at Greenhill Battery, volunteered to place a flagstaff on a mound to act as an aiming point. He carried out this dangerous task undeterred by continuous fire from enemy sharpshooters, and his action enabled the battery to open fire on hitherto concealed enemy guns which were doing great damage to some of the advanced works.

Sullivan later achieved the rank of chief boatswain's mate. He committed suicide at Kinsale, County Cork, on 28 June 1884.

References

External links
 Location of grave and VC medal (Dublin)
 Profile

1830 births
1884 deaths
19th-century Irish people
Burials at Glasnevin Cemetery
Crimean War recipients of the Victoria Cross
Irish recipients of the Victoria Cross
Irish sailors in the Royal Navy
People from Bantry
Recipients of the Conspicuous Gallantry Medal
Royal Navy personnel of the Crimean War
Royal Navy recipients of the Victoria Cross
Royal Navy sailors
People from Kinsale
Suicides in Ireland